Tales From the Organ Trade is a 2013 Canadian documentary film written and directed by Emmy Award-winning filmmaker Ric Esther Bienstock.  It was produced by Ric Esther Bienstock, Felix Golubev and Simcha Jacobovici.  The film was created in association with HBO Documentary Films, Shaw Media and Canal D. The film examines the shadowy world of black market organ trafficking. The film is narrated by David Cronenberg.

Reaction 
The film has been positively received by critics. Maclean's calls the film "a serious, superb and essential documentary that cuts through the sensationalism and hysteria surrounding its subject. It’s one of the most impressive, and incisive, works of investigative journalism I’ve seen onscreen in a long time. It’s also a virtuosic feat of story-telling." and continues to say that Ric Esther Bienstock's  film  "is a nuanced, analytical portrait of the fierce ethical dilemmas on both sides of the issue, which Bienstock distills into cautious advocacy for a sensible solution."

Awards

Festival Awards

References

External links 

2013 films
2013 documentary films
Films about organ trafficking
HBO documentary films
Donald Brittain Award winning shows
Canadian documentary television films
2010s English-language films
2010s Canadian films
2010s American films